William Jones (1836 - May 12, 1864) was an Irish-born American soldier who received the Medal of Honor for his actions in the American Civil War.

Biography 
Jones was born in Wicklow, Wicklow County, Ireland in 1836. He served as first sergeant in Company A of the 73rd New York Volunteer Infantry Regiment. He earned his medal in action at the Battle of Spotsylvania Court House, Virginia on May 12, 1864. Jones was killed in action on May 12, 1864, and thus his medal was award posthumously on December 1, 1864. He is now buried in Fredericksburg National Military Park, Fredericksburg, Virginia.

Medal of Honor Citation 
For extraordinary heroism on 12 May 1864, in action at Spotsylvania, Virginia, for capture of flag of 65th Virginia Infantry (Confederate States of America).

References 

1836 births
1864 deaths
United States Army Medal of Honor recipients
American Civil War recipients of the Medal of Honor
Union Army non-commissioned officers
Union military personnel killed in the American Civil War
Irish-born Medal of Honor recipients
Irish emigrants to the United States (before 1923)
People from Wicklow (town)